The 1948–49 BAA season was the Jets' 1st and only season in the NBA/BAA and 8th and final season as a franchise. After the season, the NBL would merge with the BAA to form the NBA.  As a result, the Jets ceased operations and were subsequently replaced by the Indianapolis Olympians.

Draft

Roster

Regular season

Season standings

Record vs. opponents

Game log

References

Indianapolis Jets seasons
Indianapolis